Love in Tawang (অসমীয়া:লভ্ ইন টাৱাং) is an Assamese language romantic film directed by Dipak Nath under the banner of Siddhartha Telefilms. Newcomers Dhruv and Spainee are in the lead roles.  This film's songs are composed by Abhijit Barman.

Cast
The cast features Assamese, Monpa, and Bhutanese artistes.
 Dhruv
 Spainee
 Arun Nath
 Atul Pachoni
 Subhash Mudok
 Biswajeet Hazarika
 Juri Devi
 Simashree Bora

Production 
Dipak Nath, writer of Mahasamar (2013), directs this film.

Soundtrack
This film's soundtrack was composed by Abhijit Barman. Lyrics by Dipak Nath. Three songs are in Assamese, one in Hindi, and one in English.

References

2010s Assamese-language films